Grădinari (until 1964 Cacova;) is a commune in Caraș-Severin County, western Romania with a population of 1,956 people. It is composed of two villages, Grădinari and Greoni (Gerőc).

Grădinari is a Slavic-origin word meaning "gardeners" in Romanian and some Slavic languages.

The commune is located in the western part of the county. It lies on the banks of the Caraș River.

Natives
 Dorinel Munteanu

References

Communes in Caraș-Severin County
Localities in Romanian Banat